The Owen-Gay Farm in Clark County and Bourbon County in Kentucky was listed on the National Register of Historic Places in 1997.

It is located on Gay Rd. at its junction with Donaldson Rd., at the Clark County-Bourbon County line.

It includes:
the house (1825-1840)
a log house (c. 1817), designated BB-362 and known as Glocca Morra School in the Kentucky Heritage Council's Historic Sites Inventory
a meathouse (c. 1825)
Ice House ruins (c. 1825)
cistern (1915-1920)
concrete water tank (c. 1945)
hay barn (c. 1900)
metal crib (1930-1940)
an undefined structure (c. 1900)
cattle barn (1910-1920)
sheep weigh house (c. 1910)
as well as agricultural acreage, fences, cemetery, and the farm's residential area which make up a contributing site.

References

Farms on the National Register of Historic Places in Kentucky
Queen Anne architecture in Kentucky
Buildings and structures completed in 1825
National Register of Historic Places in Bourbon County, Kentucky
National Register of Historic Places in Clark County, Kentucky
Historic districts on the National Register of Historic Places in Kentucky
Log buildings and structures on the National Register of Historic Places in Kentucky
1825 establishments in Kentucky